Trapania aureopunctata is a species of sea slug, a dorid nudibranch, a marine gastropod mollusc in the family Goniodorididae.

Distribution
This species was described from Sydney, New South Wales, Australia. It has also been reported from Tasmania and Victoria.

Description
The body of this goniodorid nudibranch is opaque white. There are very fine orange spots and a few larger orange spots on the body and lateral papillae.

Ecology
Trapania aureopunctata probably feeds on Entoprocta which often grow on sponges and other living substrata.

References

  Burn R. (2006) A checklist and bibliography of the Opisthobranchia (Mollusca: Gastropoda) of Victoria and the Bass Strait area, south-eastern Australia. Museum Victoria Science Reports 10:1–42

Goniodorididae
Gastropods described in 1987